Pekan Nanas is a state constituency in Johor, Malaysia, that is represented in the Johor State Legislative Assembly.

The state constituency was first contested in 2004 and is mandated to return a single Assemblyman to the Johor State Legislative Assembly under the first-past-the-post voting system. , the State Assemblyman for Pekan Nanas is Yeo Tung Siong from the Democratic Action Party (DAP), which is part of the state's ruling coalition, Pakatan Harapan (PH).

Definition 
The Pekan Nanas constituency contains the polling districts of Parit Kudus, Tanjong Ayer Hitam, Ladang South Malaya, Melayu Raya, Kampong Lubok Sawah, Tenggayon, Pengkalan Raja Pontian, Bandar Pekan Nenas Barat, Bandar Pekan Nenas Timor, Bandar Pekan Nenas Tengah and Bandar Pekan Nenas Selatan.

History

Polling districts
According to the gazette issued on 24 March 2018, the Pekan Nanas constituency has a total of 11 polling districts.

Representation history

Election results

References 

Johor state constituencies